Person L is an American rock band fronted by Kenny Vasoli, of the pop punk band The Starting Line. Vasoli is the band's lead singer and guitarist and formed Person L in winter 2006 as an outlet to explore other musical styles. The group also consists of drummers Brian Medlin and Ryan Zimmaro (previously of the band The Prize Fight), bassist Charles Schneider (previously of the band The Suicide Pact) with keyboardist and guitarist Nate Vaeth.

History
Person L was founded by the Starting Line vocalist/bassist  Kenny Vasoli in winter 2006. Vasoli then brought members of the Minor Times, Inkling, the Prize Fight and the Suicide Pact into the group. The band performed their first show on December 22 in Lansdale, Pennsylvania. Person L released a split single with Weatherbox in May 2008. He initially wrote the song, "Storms", while on the road with The Starting Line. Person L's debut record Initial was released on August 5 on Vasoli's own label, Human Interest.

During the summer of 2008, Person L went on tour with Anthony Green and Good Old War in support of their debut record. The tour consists of bands all from Philadelphia, Pennsylvania, whose lead singers are from other bands that have had success.  Keith Goodwin of Good Old War was formerly of Days Away and Anthony Green of Circa Survive.  Following the tour with Anthony Green, Person L toured shortly with Motion City Soundtrack, followed by a tour in support of Underoath.  Following that, Person L went on tour with Steel Train and spent summer 2009 touring with Mae and then Ace Enders. In 2010 they opened for Copeland on their farewell tour, also with I Can Make A Mess Like Nobody's Business.

Person L's second album, The Positives was released on November 17, 2009 on Academy Fight Song/Human Interest. The band embarked on a tour with John Nolan and Brian Bonz on November 10, 2009. The record was released in the UK on Scylla Records, Continental Europe on Arctic Rodeo Records and in Australia on Taperjean Records.

Members
Brian Medlin - drums, percussion, backing vocals
Charlie Schneider - bass, backing vocals
Nate Vaeth - keyboards, guitar
Kenny Vasoli - vocals, guitar
Ryan Zimmaro - drums, percussion

Former members

Brian Schmutz - keyboards

Discography

Albums
Initial (2008)
The Positives (2009)

References

External links 
 Person L at MySpace
 Person L on purevolume at PureVolume

Rock music groups from Pennsylvania
American post-hardcore musical groups
American experimental rock groups